Glen Albert Larson (January 3, 1937 – November 14, 2014) was an American television producer, writer, musician, and director. His best known work in television was as the creator of the television series Alias Smith and Jones, Battlestar Galactica, Buck Rogers in the 25th Century, The Misadventures of Sheriff Lobo, Quincy, M.E., The Hardy Boys/Nancy Drew Mysteries, B. J. and the Bear, The Fall Guy, Magnum, P.I. and Knight Rider. In addition to his television work, Larson also was a member of the folk revival/satire group The Four Preps.

Career 
Larson began his career in the entertainment industry in 1956 as a member of the vocal group The Four Preps, with whom he appeared in one of the Gidget films. The Four Preps ultimately produced three gold records for Capitol, all of which Larson himself wrote and/or composed: "26 Miles (Santa Catalina)", "Big Man", and "Down by the Station". A later member of the Four Preps, David Somerville, and a session singer he knew, Gail Jensen, later collaborated with Larson to write and compose "The Unknown Stuntman", the theme from The Fall Guy; series lead Lee Majors performed this song over the opening titles.

After working for Quinn Martin on productions including The Fugitive (where he had his first writing credit), Larson signed a production deal with Universal Studios. His first hit series was Alias Smith and Jones, a 1971–1973 Western which described the activities of Hannibal Heyes and Jedediah "Kid" Curry, concentrating on their efforts to go straight. (George Roy Hill's film, scripted by William Goldman, about Butch Cassidy and the "Sundance Kid", is commonly believed to have been the inspiration for the series.)

Larson was involved in the development for television of The Six Million Dollar Man, based on Martin Caidin's novel Cyborg, into the successful series, and was one of the program's early executive producers.

Larson later secured a then-unprecedented $1 million per episode budget for Battlestar Galactica. The show incorporated many themes from LDS theology, such as sealing (marriage) for "time and eternity" and a "council of twelve". Larson, a member of the Church of Jesus Christ of Latter-day Saints in real life, had been working on the concept since 1968 with former Star Trek producer Gene L. Coon mentoring him in its early development. Although, he originally wanted to name the series Adam's Ark, he instead opted for Galactica. He was later convinced to include the word "star" in the title to capitalize on the recently released film Star Wars, eventually morphing the title into Battlestar Galactica. Unfortunately, Larson was similarly convinced to deviate from his plan to produce the property as a series of TV movies to a weekly hour-long series, which caught his crew by surprise with a production schedule more demanding than originally expected in terms of writing while it overwhelmed the series' budgetary limits.

Even with its generous budget, the series often recycled effects shots and was canceled after one season. The pilot episode, titled "Saga of a Star World" was edited into a two-hour theatrical film and a re-edit of the other episodes was released as a second theatrical feature film titled Mission Galactica: The Cylon Attack. After the series was canceled, Larson went on to create a relatively low-budget sequel titled Galactica 1980, which was set many years later, when the Galactica had reached Earth. It was even less successful than the original and was canceled after 10 episodes.

Larson re-used some of the sets, props, costumes, and effects work from Galactica for the light-hearted sci-fi series Buck Rogers in the 25th Century in 1979. Based on the comic-book character created in 1928 by Philip Francis Nowlan, Larson co-developed the series with Leslie Stevens. The feature-length pilot episode was released as a theatrical film in March 1979 and grossed $21 million at the North American box office. The weekly television series began in September 1979, running for two seasons until April 1981.

In the 1980s, Larson had further success as one of the creators of Magnum, P.I., which ran from 1980 to 1988. Around the same time, he left Universal to work for 20th Century-Fox. Additionally, Larson created The Fall Guy, which ran from 1981 to 1986. Larson's next prominent series was Knight Rider, which featured science-fiction elements with a light-hearted action-adventure scenario and limited violence. These basic elements characterized many of Larson's series' throughout the 1980s with Automan, Manimal and The Highwayman, though all of these shows were unsuccessful and none lasted more than a single season. Larson's profile declined, though he made a brief comeback in the 1990s with an adaptation of the Ultraverse comic Night Man, which lasted two seasons.

In 2003, Battlestar Galactica was remade for the Sci-Fi Channel as a miniseries; it was followed by a 2004 series, that, unlike the original, lasted multiple seasons. Larson was not involved in any capacity with the new series, though he did receive a screen credit as "Consulting Producer". After the series ended in 2009, a short-lived prequel series, Caprica, followed in 2010.  Larson was again not involved, but he was given a screen credit for the creation of certain characters.

In February 2009, media sources reported that Larson was in talks with Universal Pictures to bring Battlestar Galactica to the big screen, though any potential feature film would not be based on the recent Sci-Fi Channel series remake, but would possibly be based on the original series. The project stalled for some time; in 2011 a re-announced version was now no longer a continuation of the original series but rather a complete remake.

Criticism 
Despite his success, much criticism has been aimed at Larson for his perceived general lack of originality as many of his television series are seen as small screen "knock-offs" of feature films. Harlan Ellison once referred to him as "Glen Larceny" for the notorious similarities between Larson's shows and cinema blockbusters.

In his autobiography, The Garner Files, James Garner stated that Larson stole a number of plots of The Rockford Files (which Garner's production company co-produced), then used them for his own shows, simply changing the dialogue minimally and using different character names. Garner's group complained to the Writer's Guild; Larson was fined, and an episode of Larson's series Switch called "Death by Resurrection" had the writing credits revised to give sole credit to the writers of the original Rockford Files episode "This Case Is Closed", as it was very clearly the basis of the Switch episode.  Nevertheless, Garner felt that the fine had taught Larson nothing when he persisted in plagiarism and later copied the theme music from The Rockford Files for one of his shows. Garner stated that when Larson subsequently showed up on the Rockford set, he put his arm around Garner and said: "I hope there are no hard feelings, Jim." After Larson ignored a warning by Garner to take his arm off him, Garner claims that he punched Larson so hard that Larson "flew across the curb, into a motor home, and out the other side." TV/Movie/Celebrity expert Thomas "Duke" Miller stated that he had once asked Garner if he would work with Larsen on any other TV show and that Garner replied, "Only IF we need a dead body."

Lawsuit against Universal Studios 
In July 2011, Larson began a lawsuit against Universal Studios, alleging a decades-long fraud and claimed the studio had not paid him a share of the profits owed from the television shows he produced while working with them. Larson's involvement with Universal had begun in the 1970s, and his contractual agreement had secured him net profits from the revenues generated by the shows he worked on as a producer, including The Six Million Dollar Man, Quincy, M.E., Battlestar Galactica, Buck Rogers in the 25th Century, Magnum, P.I. and Knight Rider. The dispute was settled four years later in December 2015.

This was not the first legal wrangle Larson had with the studio, as there had previously been a disagreement over ownership of rights to the Battlestar Galactica franchise. It was ultimately determined that Larson no longer owned the television rights to the property, but retained feature film rights.

Death 
Larson died on November 14, 2014 in UCLA Medical Center, Santa Monica, California, from esophageal cancer, aged 77 and was survived by his wife Jeannie and nine children. He is buried at Rose Hill Burial Park (Oklahoma City, Oklahoma).

Awards and honors 
 Emmy Award
 1978: Nominated for Outstanding Drama Series, for Quincy, M.E.
 Grammy Award
 1979: Nominated for Best Album of Original Score Written for a Motion Picture or Television Special, for Battlestar Galactica (nomination shared with Stu Phillips, John Andrew Tartaglia, and Sue Collins)
 Edgar Award
 1973: Won for Best Episode in a TV Series Teleplay, for McCloud, "The New Mexico Connection"
 1981: Won for Best Episode in a TV Series Teleplay, for Magnum, P.I., "China Doll" (with Donald P. Bellisario)

Larson also has a star on the Hollywood Walk of Fame for his contributions to the television industry.

Filmography

Books written

References

External links 
 
 
 
 
 Glen A. Larson at Find a Grave

 

1937 births
2014 deaths
Latter Day Saints from California
American television producers
American television writers
American male television writers
American science fiction writers
Edgar Award winners
American people of Swedish descent
Deaths from esophageal cancer
Deaths from cancer in California
American male novelists
American male screenwriters
20th-century American novelists
20th-century American male writers